Grand Auglaize Bridge also known as the Brumley Swinging Bridge is a swinging bridge over the Grand Auglaize Creek near Brumley, Missouri. It was built in 1931 by engineer Joseph Dice. It was added to the National Register of Historic Places on October 8, 2020.

History 
The bridge was built in 1931. In a 2018 inspection of the bridge, it was rated as "poor." A campaign to save the bridge was launched. It was added to the List of National Register of Historic places in 2020. Since January 6, 2021, the bridge has been closed to all traffic due to structural issues. As of 2022, it's unknown when it will reopen to traffic as there are no funding available for the needed repairs.

See also
National Register of Historic Places listings in Miller County, Missouri

References

External links 

1931 establishments
Miller County, Missouri
National Register of Historic Places